Lương Duy Cương (born 7 November 2001) is a Vietnamese professional footballer who plays as a centre-back for V.League 1 club SHB Đà Nẵng and the Vietnam national team.

At the 2022 AFC U-23 Asian Cup, he was also used as a defensive midfielder.

Career statistics

Club

International

Honours
Vietnam U-23
 AFF U-23 Championship: 2022
 Southeast Asian Games: 2021
Vietnam
VFF Cup: 2022

References

External links
 

2001 births
Living people
Association football central defenders
Vietnamese footballers
Association football defenders
SHB Da Nang FC players
Vietnam youth international footballers
Competitors at the 2021 Southeast Asian Games
Southeast Asian Games competitors for Vietnam